Daniel Sutherland Davidson (July 9, 1900—December 26, 1952) was an American anthropologist who also did important work among the Australian Aborigines in the 1930s.

Life
Davidson was born in Cohoes in New York in 1900, the son of a travelling salesman, Matthew H. Davidson and his wife Laura (Sutherland). He studied at the University of Pennsylvania graduating in 1923, and taking successively a Master's (1924) and Doctoral degree in anthropology (1928). He was appointed instructor at his alma mater, remaining there, apart from a brief stint at the University of Buffalo for the academic year 1932-1932, until 1946. He spent a year at the University of Oregon before accepting a professorship at the University of Washington where he taught until his untimely death three years later.

Davidson's initial research focused, under the direction of his mentor Frank Speck, on the eastern Algonquian, where he developed an archaeological approach. Already with his doctoral dissertation however his deep interest in the indigenous population of Australia emerged as he applied the diffusionist model of the age and area theory to antipodean ethnographical materials. His doctoral thesis The Chronological Aspects of Certain Australian Social Institutions as inferred from Geographical Distribution was subject to a scathing critique at the time by one of the major authorities on Australian ethnography, A. R. Radcliffe-Brown.

A grant from the American Philosophical Society enabled him to do fieldwork over nearly two years in northern Australia (1930-1931), followed up by a further stay in 1938-1939. Over this time, Davidson managed to gather a list of native vocabularies amounting to some 4200 words, collected from informants speaking 19 different languages of Western Australia. Much of this material has yet to receive close attention from researchers.

In 1938 he published A Preliminary Register of Australian Tribes and Hordes together with An Ethnic Map of Australia, a magisterial synthesis of his close sieving of the available ethnographic materials regarding Aboriginal groups. He followed this up with a monograph in 1941 on Australian tribal string figures, exhibiting a prestidigitator's mastery for replicating such designs which he had already demonstrated in a paper he had published in a 1927 paper on string figures among the Virginian Indians.

Davidson also retrieved unpublished manuscript material written by Edith Hassell on the myths of the Koreng tribe of Western Australia, and edited it for publication over 1934 and 1935.

Notes

Citations

Sources

1900 births
1952 deaths
University of Pennsylvania
University of Washington faculty
University at Buffalo faculty
20th-century American anthropologists